From the list of National Natural Landmarks, these are the National Natural Landmarks in Arizona.  There are 10 in total.

References

Arizona
Arizona nature-related lists